Eustacius (died 1241) was a 13th-century Irish Roman Catholic bishop.

Previously Archdeacon of Connor, he was elected bishop in 1226 and received possession of the temporalities on 5 May that year.

References

1341 deaths
Archdeacons of Connor
13th-century Roman Catholic bishops in Ireland